Mehdi Messaoudi (born 8 March 1989) is a French-Moroccan former professional footballer who played as a defender. His first name is often misspelled as Medhi.

Career
Messaoudi was born in Nice, France. He joined AS Saint-Étienne in 2004. After spending nearly four years in their youth system, he began training with the senior squad for the 2008–09 season. However, he was officially promoted to the senior squad, along with Yoann Andreu and Lounis Lanseur, following the firing of Laurent Roussey and the hiring of new manager Alain Perrin who was looking to reshuffle Saint-Étienne's defense and fill the squad, which was decimated with injuries. He was assigned the number 31 shirt.

Messaoudi made his professional debut on 20 December 2008 coming on as a substitute playing 35 minutes in a 2–0 victory over Auxerre.

He moved to Championnat National 2 club Athlético Marseille in 2018. After 1,5 years at AS Moulins, Messaoudi joined Régional 1 club SC Courthézon. In the summer 2021, he moved to US Marseille Endoume.

References

External links
 
 

1989 births
Living people
French sportspeople of Moroccan descent
Association football defenders
French footballers
Moroccan footballers
Footballers from Nice
Morocco under-20 international footballers
Ligue 1 players
Championnat National players
Championnat National 2 players
Championnat National 3 players
AS Saint-Étienne players
Gap HAFC players
Grenoble Foot 38 players
FC Aurillac Arpajon Cantal Auvergne players
FC Martigues players
US Pontet Grand Avignon 84 players
Athlético Marseille players
AS Moulins players
US Marseille Endoume players